Lelu Island is a small island in Lelu Harbour, in the Lelu municipality of Kosrae.  It is home to the Leluh archaeological site.

Education
Kosrae State Department of Education operates Lelu Elementary School on Lelu Island. High school students attend Kosrae High School in Tofol.

References

Islands of Kosrae